Kataram is a village in Kataram mandal of Jayashankar Bhupalpally district in the state of Telangana in India.

References 

Villages in Jayashankar Bhupalpally district
Mandals in Jayashankar Bhupalpally district